Ankara Opera House of the Turkish State Opera and Ballet is the largest of the three venues for opera and ballet in Ankara, Turkey, the other two being Leyla Gencer Sahnesi in Ostim and Operet Sahnesi (Operetta Theater) in Sıhhiye.

The building was originally designed by the Turkish architect Şevki Balmumcu as an exhibition center, who came first in an international competition for the project in 1933. It was later converted into an opera house by the German architect Paul Bonatz, and started serving this function on April 2, 1948.

The same building also serves as a theatre venue for the Turkish State Theatres under the name Büyük Tiyatro. The construction of a new main opera house for Ankara, in the vicinity of the original and of considerably larger capacity, is underway since 2005.

See also
Turkish State Opera and Ballet
Turkish State Theatres

Gallery

External links

Official website 
Ankara State Opera and Ballet Building 
Information on the current season and repertoire
Architectural information on the Museum of Architecture website

opera house
Opera houses in Turkey
Entertainment venues in Ankara
Theatres completed in 1948
Music venues completed in 1948
Turkish State Theatres